The Hobartville Stakes is an Australian Turf Club Group 2 Thoroughbred horse race, for three-year-olds at set weights, over a distance of 1400 metres. It is held at Rosehill Gardens Racecourse in Sydney, Australia in the early autumn.  Prize money is $400,000.

History
Originally an early spring event, it was transferred to the autumn in 1978, along with the three-year-old "triple crown", Canterbury Guineas, Rosehill Guineas and Australian Derby. The Canterbury Guineas was subsequently replaced by the Randwick Guineas in 2006, as the first leg of the "triple crown". The Hobartville Stakes is named after one of the most historic stud farms in New South Wales.

Distance
 1925–1972 - 7 furlongs (~1400 metres)
 1973 onwards - 1400 metres

Grade
 1925–1978 -  Principal race
 1979 onwards - Group 2 race

Venue
 During World War II the event was held at Randwick Racecourse
 1983–2001 - Warwick Farm Racecourse
 2002–2005 - Randwick Racecourse
2006 onwards - Rosehill Gardens Racecourse

Gallery of noted winners

Winners

 2023 - Osipenko
 2022 - Anamoe
 2021 - Aegon
 2020 - Brandenburg
 2019 - The Autumn Sun
 2018 - Kementari
 2017 - Man From Uncle
 2016 - Press Statement
 2015 - Hallowed Crown
 2014 - Dissident
 2013 - Pierro
 2012 - Wild And Proud
 2011 - Ilovethiscity
 2010 - Monton
 2009 - Mic Mac
 2008 - Serious Speed
 2007 - Mutawaajid
 2006 - Racing To Win
 2005 - Outback Prince
 2004 - Impaler
 2003 - Thorn Park
 2002 - Lonhro
 2001 - Sir Clive
 2000 - Fairway
 1999 - Arena
 1998 - Pleasure Giver
 1997 - Monet's Cove
 1996 - Nothin’ Leica Dane
 1995 - Danewin
 1994 - Clearly Chosen
 1993 - Navy Seal
 1992 - Take The Road
 1991 - Pre Record
 1990 - Shaftesbury Avenue
 1989 - Swiftly Carson
 1988 - High Regard
 1987 - Merry Ruler
 1986 - Chanteclair
 1985 - Phillip
 1984 - Sir Dapper
 1983 - Marscay
 1982 - Rare Form
 1981 - Shaybisc
 1980 - †race not held
 1979 - Bemboka Yacht
 1978 - Kapalaran
 1977 - Lord Silver Man
 1976 - Keegan
 1975 - Rosie Heir
 1974 - Manawapoi
 1973 - Imagele
 1972 - Outback
 1971 - Fairy Walk
 1970 - Baguette
 1969 - King Bogan
 1968 - Rajah
 1967 - Great Exploits
 1966 - Garcon
 1965 - Fair Summer
 1964 - Farnworth
 1963 - Romanda
 1962 - Peace Of Mind
 1961 - Young Brolga
 1960 - Wenona Girl
 1959 - Martello Towers
 1958 - Wiggle
 1957 - Todman
 1956 - Commissionaire
 1955 - Kingster
 1954 - Pride Of Egypt
 1953 - Barfleur
 1952 - Suncup
 1951 - Hydrogen
 1950 - Careless
 1949 - Chastise
 1948 - San Domenico
 1947 - Temeraire
 1946 - Prince Standard
 1945 - Magnificent
 1944 - Shannon
 1943 - Flight
 1942 - Hall Stand
 1941 - All Love
 1940 - Flying Knight
 1939 - High Caste
 1938 - Aeolus
 1937 - Caesar
 1936 - Gold Rod
 1935 - Hadrian
 1934 - Silver King
 1933 - Limarch
 1932 - Bronze Hawk
 1931 - Ammon Ra
 1930 - Veilmond
 1929 - Toper
 1928 - Mollison
 1927 - Merry Mint
 1926 - Rampion
 1925 - Amounis

† Not raced in calendar year due to change of schedule as race moved from early spring to late summer

See also
 List of Australian Group races
 Group races

External links 
First three placegetters Hobartville Stakes (ATC)

References

Horse races in Australia
Randwick Racecourse